Zeudi Araya (born 10 February 1951) is an Eritrean-Italian former actress, singer, model and film producer.

Career
On a journey to Italy in 1972, Araya recorded a commercial for coffee, where she was introduced to director Luigi Scattini, who cast her with Beba Lončar in La ragazza dalla pelle di luna shot in the Seychelles. In 1973, songs composed by Piero Umiliani she sang in the score of another Scattini film where she played the lead role (La ragazza fuoristrada) were released on a 45 rpm record. From 1973 to 1975, several roles in movies followed, most of them directed by Scattini. In 1976, she appeared with Paolo Villaggio in the Fantozzi-style comedy Il signor Robinson by Sergio Corbucci. She also appeared in the Italian version of Playboy magazine in March 1974.

Her last prominent appearance was in the epic Hearts and Armour, released in 1983. Araya subsequently withdrew from acting, and has since then been producing movies. She was at the 2011 Venice Film Festival.

Personal life
Araya's father was a politician and her uncle was a diplomat in Rome. She was married to film producer Franco Cristaldi from 1983 until his death in 1992. Since 1994 she lives with the director Massimo Spano, with whom she has a son.

Selected filmography

La ragazza dalla pelle di luna – "Simone" (1973)
La ragazza fuoristrada – "Maryam" (1973)
The Prey – "Nagaina" (1974)
The Body – "Simoa" (1974)
La peccatrice – "Debra" (1975)
Mr. Robinson – "Venerdì" (1976)
Neapolitan Mystery – "Elizabeth" (1978)
Tesoro mio – "Tesoro Hoaua" (1979)
Atrocious Tales of Love and Deat – "Elizabeth Hover" (1979) 
Hearts and Armour – "Marfisa" (1983)
Control – "Sheba" (1987)

Producer
Marching in Darkness -"Zeudi Araya Cristaldi" (1996)
Franco Cristaldi e il suo cinema Paradiso (2009)

Television
Maurizio Costanzo Show (TV show) – "Herself" (1996)DiscographyOltre l'acqua del fiume/Maryam'' (Bla Bla, BBR 1338, 7") (1973)

References

External links

1951 births
Living people
People from Southern Region (Eritrea)
Eritrean actresses
Italian film actresses
Italian film producers
Eritrean emigrants to Italy
20th-century Eritrean women singers
20th-century Italian women singers
20th-century Italian actresses